Applied General Certificate of Education (AGCE) is a vocational qualification that replaced the AVCE in September 2005. The modular structure of each course available is also different from that of the AVCE. This course is available through many subjects that was once run under the AVCE for example, Information and Communication Technology and Health and Social Care.

The name for an Applied GCE in a particular subject, for example, would be "GCE A-level in Applied ICT". The course is available in many schools and further education colleges  and comes as three different forms - AS GCE, AGCE Single Award and AGCE Double Award.

School qualifications
Educational qualifications in the United Kingdom